Katie Foulkes (born 3 October 1976 in Geelong) is an Australian rower who competed as the women's eight coxswain in the 2000 Summer Olympics and the 2004 Summer Olympics.

References

External links

Australian female rowers
Rowers at the 2000 Summer Olympics
Rowers at the 2004 Summer Olympics
Sportspeople from Geelong
Living people
1976 births
Olympic rowers of Australia
20th-century Australian women